
Gmina Nowodwór is a rural gmina (administrative district) in Ryki County, Lublin Voivodeship, in eastern Poland.

Villages
Gmina Nowodwór contains the villages and settlements of Borki, Grabów Rycki, Grabów Szlachecki, Grabowce Dolne, Grabowce Górne, Jakubówka, Lendo Wielkie, Niedźwiedź, Nowodwór, Przestrzeń, Rycza, Trzcianki, Urszulin, Wrzosówka, Zawitała and Zielony Kąt.

Neighbouring gminas
Gmina Nowodwór is bordered by the gminas of Adamów, Kłoczew, Krzywda, Ryki and Ułęż.

References
Polish official population figures 2006

Nowodwor
Ryki County